Mirko "Mark" Liveric (born August 16, 1953) is an American retired soccer forward who spent eight years in the North American Soccer League and seven in the Major Indoor Soccer League.  He also earned sixteen caps, scoring three goals, with the U.S. national team.

NASL
Liveric, a native of Croatia, began his U.S. soccer career with the New York Cosmos in the North American Soccer League (NASL).  He spent the 1974 and 1975 seasons with the Cosmos.  On January 31, 1976, the Cosmos traded Liveric to the San Jose Earthquakes for cash.  Liveric's one full season with the Earthquakes was his most productive.  He scored ten goals in twenty games, adding nine assists.  This led to his selection as a 1976 Honorable Mention NASL All Star.  While Liveric began the 1977 season with the Earthquakes, the team traded him to the Washington Diplomats after only two games.  He then appeared in fifteen games, scoring only two goals with the Dips before moving back to California to the Oakland Stompers during the off season.  The Stompers only lasted one season before folding and Liveric found himself with the Edmonton Drillers at the beginning of the 1979 season, only to be traded back to the New York Cosmos after only five games.  He spent the 1980 season in New York before the Cosmos traded him, for a second time, to the San Jose Earthquakes.

MISL
In 1980, Liveric joined the Baltimore Blast of the Major Indoor Soccer League (MISL).  He returned to the NASL for one last outdoor season in 1981 with the Earthquakes.  In 1981, Liveric joined the New York Arrows (MISL) and spent the next three seasons with them.  During the 1983-1984 quarterfinal playoff season with the Blast, Liveric was part of a brawl between the two teams.  As a result, the league suspended him for two playoff games and five regular-season games.  However, in July 1984, the Arrows sold Liveric to Kansas City Comets after the Arrows went bankrupt.  As a result, Liveric sat out the first five games with the Comets in order to serve his suspension.  Liveric played the next nine games then was suspended by his coach.  On January 4, 1985, the Comets sold Liveric to the New York Cosmos.  After the Cosmos folded during the 1984-1985 season, the Cosmos released Liveric and he signed with the Pittsburgh Spirit in March 1985.  He played out the season with the Spirit.  In 1986, Liveric joined the New York Express (MISL).  However, the Express made it only to the All Star break before folding.

National team
Liveric earned sixteen caps with the U.S. national team between 1973 and 1980, scoring three goals.  His first game came in a 1-0 loss to Poland on August 3, 1973 at Soldier Field in Chicago.  He scored his first goal two days later in Windsor as the U.S. defeated Canada 2-0.  His last game came in a 2-1 loss to Canada in a November 1, 1980 World Cup Qualifier at Empire Stadium in Vancouver.  Liveric came off for Steve Moyers in the 76th minute.

References

External links
 NASL/MISL stats

1953 births
Living people
People from Zadar County
American expatriate sportspeople in Canada
American expatriate soccer players
American soccer players
Baltimore Blast (1980–1992) players
Edmonton Drillers (1979–1982) players
Expatriate soccer players in Canada
Association football forwards
Kansas City Comets (original MISL) players
Major Indoor Soccer League (1978–1992) players
New York Arrows players
New York Cosmos players
New York Cosmos (MISL) players
New York Express players
North American Soccer League (1968–1984) players
Oakland Stompers players
Pittsburgh Spirit players
San Jose Earthquakes (1974–1988) players
United States men's international soccer players
Washington Diplomats (NASL) players
Yugoslav emigrants to the United States